Cheney Stadium is a multi-purpose stadium located in Tacoma, Washington, United States. Originally built for baseball, the stadium is currently home to the Tacoma Rainiers of the Pacific Coast League, as well as professional soccer club Tacoma Defiance of the MLS Next Pro. The stadium opened in 1960 and has a capacity of 6,500. It is next to Henry Foss High School, and the stadium has an agreement with the school to use the school parking lot for parking.

History
Cheney Stadium is named for Ben Cheney, a local businessman who worked to bring minor league baseball to Tacoma and also was put in control of the project.  Cheney Stadium was constructed in 42 working days after the San Francisco Giants had committed to moving their Triple-A affiliate from Phoenix if the city could open the stadium for the beginning of the 1960 season.  Construction included light towers and wooden grandstand seats from Seals Stadium in San Francisco.  Several of the wooden grandstand seats are still in place today.

Cheney Stadium has been home to Pacific Coast League baseball continuously since 1960, in the form of seven teams: the Tacoma Giants (1960–65), Cubs (1966–71), Twins (1972–77), Yankees (1978), Tugs (1979), Tigers  (A's) (1980–94), and the Rainiers (Mariners) (1995–present).

Notable players who played in Cheney Stadium include Baseball Hall of Fame inductees Juan Marichal, Gaylord Perry, Reggie Jackson and Ken Griffey Jr., as well as Tom Kelly, Jose Canseco, Mark McGwire, Jason Giambi, Félix Hernández, Cliff Lee and Alex Rodriguez.

The stadium hosted the baseball competition of the 1990 Goodwill Games and hosted the 30th annual Triple-A All-Star Game on July 12, 2017.

It was the Seattle Mariners' alternate training site in 2020 when the COVID-19 pandemic forced the cancellation of the Minor League Baseball campaign and the abbreviation of the Major League Baseball season.

2011 renovation
On November 11, 2009, it was announced the City of Tacoma was considering a $30 million renovation to Cheney Stadium. Early renovation plans included a new grandstand superstructure, roof and concourse, as well as new concession stands, seats, luxury suites and a restaurant. The proposal drew little controversy from taxpayers.

On November 19, 2009, the Tacoma Rainiers renewed their lease with the City of Tacoma to keep playing at Cheney Stadium for 32 years. The deal relied on the renovation proposal getting passed. The proposal, now said to be $28 million in cost, was approved on November 25, 2009. The approval means the Rainiers will continue to play in Tacoma until at least 2041, and renovations were completed before the 2011 season. The renovations included basic repairs, 16 luxury suites, a kids' "play area", more restrooms and concession stands, and a new restaurant.

Soccer

The reserve team of the Seattle Sounders of Major League Soccer, known at the time as Seattle Sounders FC 2, moved to Cheney Stadium in 2018. The team rebranded as the Tacoma Defiance in 2019, but maintained the Sounders affiliation. The club plans to build their own soccer-specific stadium in a nearby parking lot, with assistance from the Rainiers, and aims to open the new ground in 2021. OL Reign, then known as Reign FC, of the National Women's Soccer League announced their move to Cheney Stadium in 2019, and will join the Defiance at the new stadium. It takes less than a day to convert the stadium between baseball and soccer by removing the pitchers mound and covering the infield with sod. Reign moved their home matches to Lumen Field beginning with the 2022 season.

Gallery

References

External links

 Cheney Stadium Home Page
 Cheney Stadium - Tacoma Sports
 Cheney Stadium on MinorLeagueBallparks.com
 Ben Cheney Stadium Views - Ball Parks of the Minor Leagues

Minor league baseball venues
OL Reign
Sports venues in Tacoma, Washington
1960 establishments in Washington (state)
Tourist attractions in Tacoma, Washington
1990 Goodwill Games venues
National Women's Soccer League stadiums
Pacific Coast League ballparks